Srednekansky District is an administrative district (raion), one of the eight in Magadan Oblast, Russia. As a municipal division, it is incorporated as Srednekansky Urban Okrug. It is located in the central and northern parts of the oblast.  Its administrative center is the urban locality (an urban-type settlement) of Seymchan. As of the 2010 Census, the total population of the district was 3,228, with the population of Seymchan accounting for 87.3% of that number.

Geography
The district borders the Sakha Republic in the north and northwest, Bilibinsky District of Chukotka Autonomous Okrug and Severo-Evensky District in the northeast, Omsukchansky District in the east, Khasynsky District in the south, Yagodninsky District in the southwest, and Susumansky District in the west.

The Omolon flows at the northeastern border. The Namyndykan, Seymchan, Buyunda, Korkodon, Bulun, and their tributaries flow across the district.

History
The district was established on August 23, 1931 and had its administrative center in Srednekan. In 1934, the administrative center was moved to Taskan. Seymchan became the administrative center on December 2, 1953.

Administrative and municipal status
Within the framework of administrative divisions, Srednekansky District is one of the eight in the oblast. The urban locality (an urban-type settlement) of Seymchan serves as its administrative center.

As a municipal division, the district has been incorporated as Srednekansky Urban Okrug since January 9, 2015. Prior to that date, the district was incorporated as Srednekansky Municipal District, which was subdivided into one urban settlement and one rural settlement.

Economy
The main industries of the district are gold, silver, tin, cobalt, bismuth, tungsten, lead, zinc, and coal mining. In addition, under the protection of the mountain ranges, the area in the valley of the Kolyma River lends itself for agricultural production.

Transportation
The district is served by the Seymchan Airport in Seymchan.

References

Notes

Sources

Districts of Magadan Oblast
States and territories established in 1931
1931 establishments in the Soviet Union